Chieko (written: , , , ,  or ) is a feminine Japanese given name. Notable people with the name include:

, Japanese sprint canoeist
, blind Japanese computer scientist
, Japanese actress and singer
, Japanese voice actress and singer
, Japanese voice actress
, Japanese manga artist
, Japanese speed skater
, Japanese singer, model and actress
, Japanese gymnast
, Japanese volleyball player
, Japanese politician
, Japanese gymnast
Chieko N. Okazaki (1926–2011), American leader in the Church of Jesus Christ of Latter-day Saints (LDS Church)
, Japanese speed skater
, Japanese actress
, Japanese fencer
, Japanese professional wrestler
, Japanese poet

See also
Portrait of Chieko, a 1967 Japanese film
Chieko, Kenya, a settlement in Central Province, Kenya

Japanese feminine given names